Emily Bamford (born 11 March 1992) is an Australian alpine skier. She competed for Australia at the 2014 Winter Olympics in the alpine skiing events. Bamford spent most of her life in Doreen, Victoria. She is the daughter of Australian businessman and horse-racing tycoon Kevin Bamford. Growing up on a horse racing farm led her to compete in equestrian events and competed in dressage, showjumping, and eventing at a state level. On weekends she would visit Mt Buller to ski with her family and  joined the Mt. Buller Racing Club at the age of nine. At 16 Bamford had to choose between continuing to compete in equestrian or skiing. She gave up equestrian to pursue competitive skiing and moved to Stratton Mountain in Vermont USA to attend Stratton Mountain School, a college-preparatory boarding school which focuses on winter sports. Bamford represented Australia in the Junior World Championships of 2009, 2011 and 2012. At 21, she made her Olympic debut in Alpine Skiing at the Sochi 2014 Olympic Winter Games. She placed 50th in the Giant Slalom event and did not finish the Slalom. Bamford attended Bates College in Lewiston, Maine and graduated in 2015.

References

External links
Official website
http://corporate.olympics.com.au/athlete/emily-bamford

1992 births
Australian female alpine skiers
Alpine skiers at the 2014 Winter Olympics
Olympic alpine skiers of Australia
Skiers from Melbourne
Living people
People from the City of Whittlesea
Bates College alumni
Australian expatriate sportspeople in the United States